Boża Wola railway station is a railway station in Boża Wola, eastern Poland. The station is served by Koleje Mazowieckie, who run trains from Kutno to Warszawa Wschodnia.

References
Station article at kolej.one.pl

Railway stations in Poland opened in 1902
Railway stations in Masovian Voivodeship
Railway stations served by Koleje Mazowieckie
Grodzisk Mazowiecki County